Garden Football Club is a Nepali semi-professional football club based in Fulbari, Pokhara, known as Garden is one of the most competitive team in western region in Nepal.

Season 2069 B.S. (2012–13 AD)
The club was successful in winning the Balram Memorial Kaski District League, Sainik Cup, ABC Cup, Bhimkali Cup, Bagar Vai Khalak Cup, Lamachaur cup, Adarsha Cup and other local cups.

Club Officials
Board of directors

President: Milan Gurung

Training Staff

Coach: Himal Gurung
 Assistant Coach: Amrit Gurung

Achievements
Kaski District League: 1
 2013
Adrasha Cup: 1
 2013

Current squad

Bikash Gurung, DF (Captain)
Subash Gurung, DF
Bishwa Gurung, MF
Som Gurung, GK
Tenzin Namgyal, GK
Biraj Gurung, MF
Bidhan Karki, ST
Madan Gurung, MF
Sidarth Gurung, MF
Anil Gurung, ST
Bimal Basnet, ST
Kumar Gurung, ST
Kiran Gurung, DF
Suraj Shahi, DF

References

External links
http://www.facebook.com/GardenSpjsFootballClub?fref=ts

Football clubs in Nepal
Sport in Pokhara